Joan Campins Vidal (born 24 June 1995) is a Spanish professional footballer who plays for Lleida Esportiu. Mainly a right back, he can also play as a winger.

Club career
Born in Sa Pobla, Majorca, Balearic Islands, Campins finished his graduation with local RCD Mallorca. He made his senior debuts with the reserves in 2012–13 season, in Segunda División B.

On 2 August 2013, Campins signed a four-year deal with FC Barcelona, being initially assigned to B-team in Segunda División. On 8 September, Campins made his professional debut, in a 2–2 away draw against CD Tenerife.

On 29 January 2016, Campins was loaned to Real Zaragoza also in the second tier. On 13 August, he signed a two-year contract with fellow league team CF Reus Deportiu.

Club statistics

Honours
Barcelona
 UEFA Youth League: 2013–14

References

External links
 FC Barcelona official profile 
 
 

1995 births
Living people
People from Sa Pobla
Spanish footballers
Spanish expatriate footballers
Footballers from Mallorca
Association football defenders
Association football wingers
Segunda División B players
Segunda División players
RCD Mallorca B players
FC Barcelona Atlètic players
Real Zaragoza players
CF Reus Deportiu players
SD Tarazona footballers
Fehérvár FC players
Belgian Pro League players
Royal Excel Mouscron players
Lleida Esportiu footballers
Spain youth international footballers
Spanish expatriate sportspeople in Hungary
Spanish expatriate sportspeople in Belgium
Expatriate footballers in Hungary
Expatriate footballers in Belgium